Alkaline Trio / Hot Water Music is a split EP by Alkaline Trio and Hot Water Music , punk rock bands based in Chicago and Gainesville, Florida respectively. The EP was released on January 22, 2002, through Jade Tree.

In addition to new material, the EP features each band performing cover versions of songs from the other band's catalogue: Alkaline Trio covered Hot Water Music's “Rooftops” (from No Division) and Hot Water Music covered Alkaline Trio's “Radio” (from Maybe I'll Catch Fire) and “Bleeder” (from I Lied My Face Off).

It was the first release by Alkaline Trio with drummer Derek Grant who replaced previous drummer Mike Felumlee in July 2001. Both bands later re-released their songs from the EP on compilation albums, with the tracks by Alkaline Trio appearing on Remains in 2007 and the tracks by Hot Water Music appearing on Till the Wheels Fall Off in January 2008.

The EP peaked at #36 on the Billboard Top Independent Charts in July 2002.

Reception 

Critical reception to the EP was positive, with Kevin Hoskins of Allmusic praising “Queen of Pain” and God Deciding as representative of each band's best material to date, specifically praising George Rebelo’s drumming.

Jason Thompson of PopMatters, praised the tracks by Alkaline Trio over Hot Water Music’s, preferring Matt Skiba’s singing voice to Chuck Ragan’s, and remarking of the latter that; “All too often the vocals are of that saliva drenched, back of the throat variety, which takes out a lot of the punch of this group, whose musical abilities are as tight as the Alkaline Trio’s.”

Track listing

Personnel

Alkaline Trio 
 Matt Skiba – guitar, lead vocals
 Dan Andriano – bass, backing vocals
 Derek Grant – drums

Hot Water Music 
 Chuck Ragan – guitar, lead vocals
 Chris Wollard – guitar, lead vocals
 Jason Black – bass 
 George Rebelo – drums

References 

Alkaline Trio EPs
Hot Water Music albums
2002 EPs
Split EPs
Jade Tree (record label) EPs